The 1970 Denver Broncos season was the team's 11th season in professional football and first in the National Football League (NFL) after the merger. Led by fourth-year head coach and general manager Lou Saban, the Broncos posted a record of five wins, eight losses, and one tie, the same as the previous season, and were last in the new four-team AFC West division.

Denver won four of its first five games, but then had only one win and one tie in the final nine games. Running back Floyd Little became the first player to lead his conference in rushing for a last place team.

Offseason

NFL draft

Personnel

Staff

Roster

Regular season

Schedule

Standings

Awards and honors 
 Floyd Little, AFC Rushing champion

References

External links 
 Denver Broncos – 1970 media guide
 1970 Denver Broncos at Pro-Football-Reference.com

Denver Broncos seasons
Denver Broncos
1970 in sports in Colorado